USS Velocity is a name the U.S. Navy has used more than once in naming its warships:

  was constructed at Morris Heights, New York, by the noted boat-builder, Charles L. Seabury, and owned by W. W. Stephens prior to World War I when she was inspected for naval service.
 , was a minesweeper laid down on 21 July 1941 at Chickasaw, Alabama.

References 

United States Navy ship names